Bootstrappers is the first release by the Bootstrappers, which at the time featured guitarist Elliott Sharp and the Reactionaries/Minutemen/Firehose rhythm section of bassist Mike Watt and drummer George Hurley.

On the album, Watt used a Guild Ashbory electric bass, an instrument the approximate size of a mandolin with rubber-band-like silicon strings.

After this album, bassist Mike Watt was replaced by bassist Thom Kotik and drummer George Hurley was replaced by drummer Jan Jakub Kotík.

Track listing
The Memory Is A Muscle – 3:36
Spider Baby – 2:30
New Boots – 1:05
Taxista – 1:14
Flicker – 1:39
Third Rail – 2:08
Media Dub – 8:00
D-I-A-L-C-A-S-H – 4:10
X/Delta – 2:52
Their Faces Are Green and Their Hands Are Blue – 1:49
Presidential Apology – 4:51
Mud – 1:28
Indeed – 1:31
Empty-Vee – 3:39
Long Beach Dub/Feen – 7:04
Maneuvers – 4:59
All songs composed/credited to George Hurley, Elliott Sharp, and Mike Watt.

Musical Personnel
Elliott Sharp - guitar, sampler
Mike Watt - bass
George Hurley - drums

References

Bootstrappers (band) albums
1989 debut albums